The Whistler Sea to Sky Climb, previously known as the Whistler Mountaineer, was a sight-seeing railway service. It was operated by Rocky Mountaineer Vacations (RMV) tour company, based in Vancouver, British Columbia, Canada who operate vintage trains over numerous sightseeing routes in Western Canada. It was established in 2006 and discontinued in 2015 after the retirement of Rocky Mountaineer's RedLeaf service fleet.

Routes
The Whistler Sea to Sky Climb operated over the former lines of the BC Rail now owned by Canadian National Railway between stations in:

 North Vancouver, British Columbia (North Vancouver station)
 Whistler, British Columbia (Whistler railway station)

References 

British Columbia railways
Named passenger trains of Canada
Whistler, British Columbia
Railway services introduced in 2006
Railway services discontinued in 2015
routes